Bruny Island (Nuenonne: Lunawanna-alonnah) is a  island located off the south-eastern coast of Tasmania, Australia. The island is separated from the Tasmanian mainland by the D'Entrecasteaux Channel, and its east coast lies within the Tasman Sea. Storm Bay is located to the island's northeast. Both the island and the channel are named after French explorer, Antoine Bruni d'Entrecasteaux. Its traditional Aboriginal name is lunawanna-allonah, which survives as the name of two island settlements, Alonnah and Lunawanna.

Geography
Geologically, Bruny Island is actually two land masses—North Bruny and South Bruny—that are joined by a long, narrow, sandy isthmus, often referred to as "The Neck". The holiday village of Dennes Point is located in North Bruny, while South Bruny is the site of the towns of Alonnah, Adventure Bay and Lunawanna.

Outside of its settlements, the island is covered with grazing fields and large tracts of dry eucalyptus forest. Inland forests have been logged, but other large sections—mostly along the south-eastern coast—are preserved as the South Bruny National Park. Bruny's channel side is far more sheltered and a favourite fishing and recreational boating area for local and interstate visitors. Adventure Bay is located on the eastern side of the isthmus, while Isthmus Bay is located on the western side.

Access to the island is by vehicular ferry, funded by the State Government. Since 1954, four vessels have operated the Bruny Island Ferry service between the island and Kettering on the mainland. The service currently uses the vessel, Mirambeena, which is plied by a Voith-Schneider propulsion system rather than a conventional propeller. There is a public Airfield, Bruny Island Airport located on North Bruny, just north of The Neck, however the small runway is mostly suited to small planes and there are no scheduled flights.

The d'Entrecastaux Channel region, sheltered by Bruny Island, is increasingly subject to foreshore erosion, some areas have begun sandbagging to reduce the effects.

History
Bruny Island was originally inhabited by Aboriginal Tasmanians, and there is still a large community of people who live on the Island and identify as Aboriginal. Abel Tasman tried to land in the vicinity of Adventure Bay in November 1642.

In 1773, Tobias Furneaux was the first recorded European to land on the island at Adventure Bay (named after his ship); four years later on 26 January 1777 James Cook's two ships, the Resolution and Discovery stayed in the bay area for two days. Cook carved his initials in a tree that was destroyed in a 1905 bushfire and is now commemorated by a plaque. In 1788 and again in 1792 (with Matthew Flinders), William Bligh stayed in the Adventure Bay area.

The island itself, however, is named after the French explorer Bruni d'Entrecasteaux who explored the Channel region and discovered it to be an island in 1792. It was known as Bruni Island until 1918, when the spelling was changed to Bruny.

Whaling was conducted off the coast of Bruny Island in the first half of the 19th century. The British whaler, Alexander, was reported to be whaling in Adventure Bay in 1804. In 1805, the British whalers Richard and Mary, Ocean and the Sydney whaler King George were reported there in the winter months. The American whaler Topaz was there in 1807. Colonial entrepreneurs also operated shore-based whaling stations there. Bethune and Kelly had a station operating in Adventure Bay by August 1826. Kelly and Lucas had another at Bull Bay. Young and Walford had one at Trumpeter Bay. Alexander Imlay applied for a site as a whaling station at Cloudy Bay in 1837, and Brown and Rogers did the same in 1842. These stations had all ceased operating by 1850, although whaling vessels sometimes anchored offshore in the second half of the century.

Even though "Cooktown" was marked on maps as early as the 1840s, the island was not officially opened up to European settlement until the late 1800s when the timber industry took off. South Bruny was opened up by numerous tramways and haulages, some horse-drawn and some using modified locomotives. The longest and best preserved tramway runs from Adventure Bay to the far southeast corner of the island. Almost all settlements on South Bruny were originally opened as timber ports, owned by the different timber companies operating on the island. Lunawanna (formerly Daniels Bay), Alonnah (formerly Mills Reef) and Adventure Bay were some of the largest ports operating on the island. At Daniels Bay, the settlement was separated from the timber jetty as the tramway was forced to trace along the south side of the bay in order to reach deep water, as most of Daniels Bay was too shallow to bring boats in. Most settlements of South Bruny now serve as shack towns or holiday locations.

Since the 1920s, the island has become known as a holiday location with surfing beaches, National Parks and historical sites. In more recent history the Bruny Island was the site of a land transfer by the state government to local Aboriginal people.

Environment
Bruny Island is classified by BirdLife International as an Important Bird Area because it supports the world's largest population of the endangered forty-spotted pardalote, up to a third of the world population of the swift parrot, all 12 of Tasmania's endemic bird species, and up to 240,000 breeding pairs of the short-tailed shearwater (or Tasmanian muttonbird). In March 2021, awareness was raised about the feral cat population. This has been steadily growing over the last decade. The local residents have opened an inquiry into the sudden large number of feral cats. With concerns of this spike in numbers having adverse affects on the environment and wildlife. This inquiry, Taskforce Tom, has discovered some of the feral population are the size of large dogs. Initial findings strongly suggest the feral cats migrated from the Eastern Shore of Tasmania. Namely the Howrah/Tranmere region.
On the issue of feral cats, an alternative view taken by some wildlife ecologists is that cats are a naturalized alien species in much of Australia, and that the best current approach to conservation of their prey species is, in general, ensuring adequate intact habitats.  An exception can be small islands where eradication techniques allow, especially because such islands are often important refuges but this is, unfortunately, impractical at present on islands the size of Bruny.  Control methodologies are under active investigation and can be expected to improve. Multiple vegetation types are seen across the island, including wet sclerophyll forest, coastal healthland and dry sclerophyll forests.

Tourism 
A key contributor to Bruny Island's economy is its growing tourism industry. Being home to the South Bruny National Park, tourism on the island centres on the showcase of its natural assets.

The Cape Bruny Lighthouse, first lit in 1838, is an iconic Australian lighthouse. It was the third lighthouse built in Tasmania, and the fourth in all of Australia, and was the longest continuously manned lighthouse in the country until it was automated in 1993. It was removed from service in 1996, and became part of the South Bruny National Park in 2000. Guided tours of the structure are available.

In 2010/11, overall visitors to Bruny Island increased 4% to 74,600. The island is primarily a day-trip destination with only 21,800 visitors staying on the island overnight. There are a growing number of tourism businesses on the island including a cheese factory, oyster farm, vineyard, smokehouse, lighthouse, museum, art gallery, two eco-cruises along with various accommodation properties and cafes.

Notable Areas 

Bruny Island offers a variety of attractions including camping, bed-and-breakfast hotels,  holiday homes and retreats, and a caravan park, as well as statues and parks.

Localities 
Bruny Island is divided into eleven bounded localities. The two largest by area are North Bruny and South Bruny which consist of national park, state forest and some grazing areas and do not have postcodes.

On North Bruny there are five populated coastal enclaves: Apollo Bay, Barnes Bay, Dennes Point, Great Bay and Killora. On South Bruny there are four: Adventure Bay, Alonnah, Lunawanna and Simpsons Bay.

Gallery

See also

 List of islands of Tasmania

References

External links 

 has links to Bruny Island businesses and information.

 
Islands of South East Tasmania
Southern Tasmania
Birdwatching sites
Important Bird Areas of Tasmania
Whaling stations in Australia